Roger Bradshaigh may refer to:

 Sir Roger Bradshaigh, 1st Baronet (1628–1684), MP for Lancashire
 Sir Roger Bradshaigh, 2nd Baronet (1649–1687), MP for Wigan
 Sir Roger Bradshaigh, 3rd Baronet (1675–1747), MP for Wigan Father of the House